Outi Marjatta Heiskanen  (26 September 1937 – 30 September 2022) was a Finnish artist. She debuted in 1971.

Outi Heiskanen is famous for her figurative graphic work. Her subjects include her family and friends, animals, as well as animal-human hybrids. Her main printmaking technique is etching, which she uses to draw the motif. She then augments the etching by aquatint or drypoint where necessary. Heiskanen is also known for her versatility as a performer, set designer and creator of happenings and performances. She was also a member of several independent artists' groups.

As a child Outi Heiskanen (nee Kanervo) traveled often with her father, who was a veterinarian. She drew pictures of animals and people at the farms. She graduated as an art teacher in 1959 and married Toivo Heiskanen. They had two daughters. In addition to her artistic career Heiskanen worked as an art teacher in schools in Oulu, Jyväskylä and Helsinki from 1959 to 1973. She was a professor of graphic department in Academy of Fine Arts in 1992, and the Academy headmaster from 1994 until 1995. In 1984, she was awarded the Pro Finlandia medal. 

Heiskanen's travels have had a great impact in her work, especially the trips to Tibet and Afghanistan.

Heiskanen died on 30 September 2022 at the age of 85, after suffering from dementia for several years.

References 

1937 births
2022 deaths
Finnish performance artists
Finnish printmakers
Pro Finlandia Medals of the Order of the Lion of Finland
People from Mikkeli